is a railway station  in the town of Fukaura, Aomori Prefecture, Japan, operated by on the East Japan Railway Company (JR East).

Lines

Station layout
Senjōjiki Station has one ground-level side platform serving a single bi-directional track. The station is unattended and is managed from Goshogawara Station. There is no station building.

History
Senjōjiki Station was opened on July 7, 1954 as the Senjōjiki Signal Stop. It was elevated in status to that of a temporary (seasonal) station on the Japan National Railways (JNR) on October 1, 1969. With the privatization of the JNR on April 1, 1987, it came under the operational control of JR East. It was elevated in status to that of a full station on October 1, 1987.

Surrounding area

The rock formations of Senjōjiki Beach, part of the Tsugaru Quasi-National Park.

See also
 List of Railway Stations in Japan

References

External links

  

Stations of East Japan Railway Company
Railway stations in Aomori Prefecture
Gonō Line
Fukaura, Aomori
Railway stations in Japan opened in 1987